Kemeys may refer to:

Edward Kemeys (1843–1907), American sculptor
Edward Kemeys (MP), (died 1623), Welsh MP for Monmouthshire, 1593
Nicholas Kemeys (died 1648), Welsh landowner and soldier
Kemeys Baronets
Kemeys Commander, village in Monmouthshire, Wales

See also
Kemys